Mission Local is a bilingual local independent online news site that also publishes a semiannual printed paper that covers the Mission District of San Francisco.

Early history
The Mission Local began as a hyperlocal project of  UC Berkeley's Graduate School of Journalism, focusing on San Francisco's Mission District. As some of the mainstream newspapers in San Francisco were shrinking and downsizing, it was believed that local media sites might fill some of the holes in reporting that were being left. The new media site was in fact also a new experiment in hyperlocal journalism. With funding from the Ford Foundation, it was launched in 2008, purposely aimed at covering the underserved neighborhood of the Mission. Berkeley Professor Lydia Chavez was its founder. It is one of the few university projects that has been turned into a fully functioning community news site. Many young journalists have worked and trained at this media news site. And in 2009 it began translating all of its contents also into Spanish.

Local community news site
The Mission Local covers all of the news from the Mission District, trying to provide context to a story so a reader can get a full understanding of an issue or situation. And it has covered many stories on how gentrification is affecting the Latino community in the Mission, And it has even made attempts to lower the walls that often divide the Latino and tech community. It writes stories that are in-depth, multi-faceted, and often issue-oriented. And it has done investigative pieces, one that led to a change in citywide restaurant policy. It is grassroots oriented in its daily news writing and covering of feature stories. And the news site has connected itself to social media, having a Facebook page, a Twitter account, and is on Instagram. The news site also updates its news stories, often several times a day.

Becoming independent
In February 2014, it was announced by Edward Wasserman, the Dean of Berkeley's Graduate School of Journalism, that U.C. Berkeley would be disconnecting itself from Mission Local, seeing it now more as a business and "...something other than journalism education." Mission Local re-launched itself as a for-profit and independent local media site in the summer of 2014 under the executive editorship of Lydia Chavez. The online news site continues to experiment in trying to find a workable and sustainable model that can be financially sound while also producing quality local journalism.

San Francisco Mission fire
On January 28, 2015, the 108-year-old building where Mission Local was located at 2588 Mission Street caught fire,  causing the loss of one life, leaving 58 homeless, and leaving the building destroyed by flames.  Their offices on the second floor sustained a lot of damages, leaving almost nothing salvageable. Yet despite losing its offices to the flames, Mission Local continued to cover the fire extensively.

Coverage and semiannual distribution of newspaper
The online media site focuses on San Francisco's Mission District, covering a neighborhood with around 60,000 people in it. Their online media site receives about 100,000 unique visitors a month. And twice a year the site distributes 10,000 free, printed editions of the Mission Local as a newspaper.

Awards
In June 2009, Mission Local won a Webby Award for being the best student news site in the country. In May 2010, Mission Local won first place for Region from the Society of Professional Journalists on How Clean Are San Francisco Restaurants? Mission Local was a Finalist for Society of Professional Journalist's Mark of Excellence Award in the fall of 2010.

References

External links
 Mission Local Online
 Mission Local Facebook
 Mission Local Twitter
 Mission Local Instagram

American news websites
Mass media in the San Francisco Bay Area
Mission District, San Francisco